Perry County is one of the 141 Cadastral divisions of New South Wales. It is located to the east of the Darling River near Pooncarie.

Perry County was named in honour of Samuel Augustus Perry (1792–1854), soldier and surveyor.

Parishes within this county
A full list of parishes found within this county; their current LGA and mapping coordinates to the approximate centre of each location is as follows:

References

Counties of New South Wales